Kimberly Sue Yap Chiu (born April 19, 1990), professionally known as Kim Chiu, is a Filipino actress, model, host, singer, dancer, and vlogger. She is currently managed by Star Magic, ABS-CBN's home-based talent agency.

Recognized as one of the royalties of Philippine show business, Chiu is popularly referred to as the "Multimedia Idol" for her acting prowess and influence. Ever since her showbiz debut after winning the first teen edition of Pinoy Big Brother, she has already accumulated 15 blockbuster hit films, 39 top-rating series, 21 chart-topping songs and a plethora of endorsements and recognitions. Forbes Asia hailed her as one of social media's most influential celebrities in Asia Pacific.

As one of the defining movie stars of her generation, her films has altogether grossed over ₱1.1 billion in local cinema, becoming one of the highest grossing actors of the 2010s decade. Chiu's biggest film to date is Bride For Rent with ₱326 million domestic gross, becoming one of the highest grossing Philippine films in history. She is a recipient of a FAMAS Award, hailed as one of the TV Queens at the Turn of the Millennium at the PMPC Star Awards for Television and has been inducted at the Eastwood City Walk of Fame.

Career

2006–2008: Career beginnings
Chiu gained prominence when she won the top prize in the reality series Pinoy Big Brother: Teen Edition. For the show, Chiu left her hometown of Cebu City and moved to Manila. She, along with the rest of the housemates entered the Big Brother house on April 23, 2006. After 42 days in the Big Brother house, she was named the Teen Big Winner with 626,562 votes (41.4% of the total votes) at the Aliw Theatre inside the Cultural Center of the Philippines Complex in Pasay. She was the only housemate who was never nominated for eviction.

After winning, Chiu became part of Star Magic.
She and her on-screen partner Gerald Anderson became regulars in ASAP XV and appeared together in several ABS-CBN shows Love Spell, comedy sitcom Aalog-Alog and in the film First Day High.

In 2007, Chiu starred in the primetime TV series entitled Sana Maulit Muli alongside Anderson which was released to significant acclaim. That year, she was nominated and eventually won the 38th Guillermo Mendoza Box Office Awards as Most Promising Female Star and Best New Female TV Personality (for Sana Maulit Muli) at the 21st PMPC Star Awards. Sana Maulit Muli was later released in Taiwan under the PTS network, under the title Chances.

Chiu then launched her debut album "Gwa Ai Di" (Hokkien ) under Star Records, which included the single Crazy Love. It reached a Gold Record status.

Gaining much recognition for her acting roles, she then starred in the movie I've Fallen For You under Star Cinema and continually appeared in numerous advertisements. In 2008, Chiu was cast in the Philippine adaptation of the South Korean TV series My Girl.

2009–2011: Breakthrough
In 2009, Chiu secured her name as a top actress in the highly acclaimed TV series entitled Tayong Dalawa. She garnered several acting awards for her portrayal of Audrey, a woman who is loved by two military men.

Her movie I Love You, Goodbye became part of Star Cinema's official entry to the 2009 Metro Manila Film Festival. It was Chiu's first role as a villain and her first film to hit P100 million mark, with her receiving several nominations under different award-giving bodies including PMPC, 12th Gawad PASADO Awards and the 34th MMFF for Best Supporting Actress.

In 2010, she then starred in the romance film Paano Na Kaya, released nationally and internationally. She also starred in the well-received primetime drama, Kung Tayo'y Magkakalayo, the highest rating teleserye of 2010 in the Philippines. In October 2010, Chiu and Anderson teamed up for the last consecutive time in the film Till My Heartaches End. In the midst of movie promotions, it was reported that the long-time couple (known as Kimerald) had split, yet the reason for the breakup was not discussed.

She top-billed in a weekly musical anthology series Your Song, as a sub-series for the 12th season called Your Song Presents: Kim. It ran for four months and led her to pair up with Sam Milby, Jake Cuenca, Pokwang, Derek Ramsay, Enrique Gil and Vice Ganda. In 2011, Chiu starred in romantic-comedy television series titled My Binondo Girl alongside Xian Lim, Matteo Guidicelli, and Jolo Revilla.

2012–present: Movies and critical success
In 2012, Chiu starred in a horror film with Vilma Santos entitled The Healing. She played a woman who is cured of glomerulonephritis through a healer but must suffer a curse. From this film, she received a number of Best Supporting Actress nominations from almost all of the film award-giving bodies, missing only the Gawad Urian and The Young Critics' Circle.

Chiu also returned to melodrama acting via Ina, Kapatid, Anak, alongside Xian Lim, Maja Salvador and Enchong Dee. After the teleserye ended with an average TV rating of 30.3% via Kantar Media/TNS, it was awarded Best Teleserye of the Year at Philippine's 2013 Yahoo Awards and was aired internationally as Her Mother's Daughter, released in foreign territories including MIPTV in France and at DISCOP West Asia in Turkey. Her portrayal also earned her an award for Best TV Drama Actress. She reunited in a movie with Anderson titled 24/7 in Love, Star Magic's ensemble film in view of the agency's 20th anniversary.

She starred in a film adaption of Ramon Bautista's novel co-starring Xian Lim, Bakit Hindi Ka Crush Ng Crush Mo?, released on July 17, 2013. Her performance received positive feedback and critics praise in view of her first comedic role on the big screen.

In January 2014, Chiu cemented her commercial draw with the romantic-comedy movie entitled Bride for Rent. Chiu plays Rocky, a poor woman who agrees to marry for money. As Star Cinema's first movie offering of 2014, the film met both critical and commercial success, earning more than P21.2 million pesos in its opening day and broke the P200 million pesos mark on its 8th day. The film established Chiu as one of the country's biggest stars having both a successful film and television career. Having grossed P325 million, it is the sixth highest grossing Filipino film of all time, the second highest grossing Filipino romantic comedy movie of all-time, third highest grossing non-MMFF film of all-time and also the highest-grossing January-released film of all-time in the country.

After the success of her two films, Chiu returned to television in the 2014 period drama, Ikaw Lamang. The series co-stars Coco Martin, Julia Montes, Jake Cuenca and KC Concepcion and dealt with social class, politics, and forbidden love. It held the first and second place viewer rating in its time slot and was awarded Best Primetime Drama Series at the 28th PMPC Star Awards for Television. This followed with the romantic comedy film, Past Tense and a portrayal as Mulan for Walt Disney Asia's 12 Days of Princess campaign.

In 2015, she appeared as one of five mistresses (alongside veterans Kris Aquino, Claudine Barretto, Iza Calzado) in the high-profile film, Etiquette for Mistresses. She recorded the Cebuano songs "Duyog" and "Labyu Langga" for the film's soundtrack. She also top-billed in the rom-com, All You Need Is Pag-Ibig, which is Star Cinema's official entry to the 2015 MMFF.

In 2016, she starred on the hit Philippine romantic drama, The Story of Us. Her performance as Tin Manalo gave her another Best Actress Awards from 6th EdukCircle Awards, 6th OFW Parangal Awards and Guillermo Mendoza. Also, on the last quarter of 2016, Kimerald loveteam was announced to set back on television via a triathlon soap opera television series Ikaw Lang ang Iibigin for the celebration of their 10th anniversary in show business.

In May 2017, Ikaw Lang ang Iibigin premiered on ABS-CBN's PrimeTanghali noontime block replacing Langit Lupa. The show debuted at Number 1 in its time slot, and consistently ranked ahead of its competition during its nine-month run.

In November 2017, she appears in the horror movie, The Ghost Bride which was also her first solo outing as an actress. She plays the role of Mayen Lim who is the main protagonist, her character is torn between living a normal though difficult life or accepting a strange business proposal called the Ghost Wedding in exchange for wealth and a comfortable life for her loved ones. She is also accompanied by Matteo Guidicelli, Alice Dixson, Christian Bables and Cacai Bautista in this said movie project which was set to show on theatres on All Saints' Day. The movie became a critical and commercial success garnering over P100m, making Kim a certified horror Queen and The Horror Princess of Philippine movies . 

In April 2018, she appears in the Filipino horror-comedy film Da One That Ghost Away directed by Tony Y. Reyes together with Ryan Bang, Enzo Pineda and the duo of Maymay Entrata and Edward Barber. The movie grossed over P8 million on its opening day and over P70 million in its entire theatrical run.

In December 2018, her movie One Great Love became Regal Film's official entry to the 2018 Metro Manila Film Festival. It was Chiu's first time Venturing into a adult, steamy oriented role and also working with both Dennis Trillo and JC de Vera. She received nomination on the 44th annual MMFF Awards for Best Actress. She also won the Film Actress of the Year in the 50th GMMSF Box-Office Entertainment Awards for her performance in the film One Great Love. The movie garnered over P50 million in its MMFF theatrical run.

In 2020, her song "Bawal Lumabas (The Classroom Song)" became the most disliked song in WISH 107.5's YouTube Channel having reportedly received 404k dislikes and 78k likes within 14 hours. The song was based from a viral edit made by DJ Squammy from her statement about the ABS-CBN franchise renewal controversy.

Personal life
Chiu is the fourth of five children to William Chiu, a Chinese businessman from Mindoro and Louella (née Yap; 1963–2013), a Philippine Sangley native who migrated from Dinagat Islands to Surigao del Sur, Philippines. She is fluent in Cebuano, Tagalog, and English, with her Waray, Hokkien, and Mandarin Chinese at a beginner level only.

Since her parents' separation in 1998, Kim had a dysfunctional relationship with both of her parents. She and her siblings were raised by their paternal grandmother and, as children, frequently moved residences in the Philippine Visayas; locating in Tacloban, Leyte, Cebu, Cagayan de Oro, General Santos, Mindoro and back to Cebu City until 2006. In 2013, she reconciled with her father "after five years of estrangement" while visiting his second partner and half-siblings in San Jose, Occidental Mindoro. A month later in June,  her biological mother, Louella, fell into a coma. Following a week of hospitalization, Louella died on June 23, 2013, due to brain aneurysm. In a eulogy dedicated to her mother, she debunked rumors of animosity over her mother's child abandonment and expressed: "An angel guides me in my decisions in life. For me, that is finally my mom."

Chiu dated co-star Gerald Anderson from 2006 to 2010.

Chiu began dating fellow Star Magic artist and leading man, Xian Lim in 2012, which was confirmed in a 2013 episode of Kris TV. They acknowledged they were "exclusively dating". On November 15, 2018, Kim Chiu confirmed she was still in a relationship with Lim during her interview on Tonight with Boy Abunda.

On March 4, 2020, Chiu was traveling along Katipunan Avenue in Quezon City on her way to a taping of her series Love Thy Woman when two unidentified gunmen, riding-in-tandem on a motorcycle, fired six gunshots at her van. Chiu and her companions were unharmed. Investigators examine the shooting as a possible case of mistaken identity. Chiu later revealed on social media that, a day after the incident, a person claiming to have been the actual target called one of her bosses to apologize.

Philanthropy and education
Chiu uses her media influence to promote various causes. She began partnership with GSK for yearly asthma awareness campaigns, Win Against Asthma, after battling asthma as a child. Chiu has since participated in disaster relief organizations such as Philippine National Red Cross and Sagip Kapamilya.  She joined the PETA campaign Free Mali along with Xian Lim. Chiu made a video plea for Mali, asking that she be moved to a sanctuary for the sake of her well-being. In August 2012, she and Lim spearheaded a relief operation in Marikina. Chiu was heavily involved with relief efforts for Typhoon Yolanda via Red Cross, which had affected parts of her hometown. Aside from giving food and water, she also held week-long clothes auctions to raise money for Typhoon victims.

By 2013, it was also revealed that the actress was involved with regularly funding Isla Pulo, an impoverished community of 1,000 inhabitants in Manila Bay, Philippines.

As one of Philippines highest paid endorsers, Chiu addressed the ongoing Pork Barrel tax scandal and the government's alleged misuse of the PDAF in a press conference on August 28, 2013, noting the amount of tax celebrities like herself pay to the government: "The money isn't a joke [...] we pay so much tax and we don't know where it's going." The Bureau of Internal Revenue confirmed Chiu as 131st top taxpayer in the country with ₱9.3M in income taxes in 2013.

In 2015, Chiu passed the UPCAT and enrolled in University of the Philippines's UPOU program for business courses.

Filmography

Television

Films

Discography

Studio albums

Singles

Singles from OST Albums 

 Mine "(Sana Maulit Muli)"
 Pusong Lito "(My Girl)"
 Sabihin Mo Na w/ "Gerald Anderson"" (My Girl)"
 Crazy Love ""Chinese Version"" "(My Girl)"
 My Only Hope  "(My Only Hope)"

Others 

 Kering Keri "(Rejoice TV Commercial)"
 Whisper, I Love You "(Close Up MV)"
 Softly "(Kim Chiu, YouTube)"
 Bawal Lumabas "(Kim Chiu, YouTube)" - An allusion to 2019-20 coronavirus pandemic and ABS-CBN franchise renewal controversy

Music videos

Awards and honors

Performance

Personality

References

External links
 
 

1990 births
Living people
Actresses from Cebu
Actresses from Leyte (province)
Big Brother (franchise) winners
Filipino actors of Chinese descent
Filipino child actresses
Filipino child singers
Filipino female models
Filipino film actresses
Filipino people of Chinese descent
Filipino television actresses
Filipino Roman Catholics
People from Cebu City
Pinoy Big Brother contestants
Star Magic
ABS-CBN personalities
Star Music artists
Visayan people
21st-century Filipino women singers
Filipino television variety show hosts
Cebuano people
Filipino women comedians